John Thorne may refer to:

 John Thorne (American football) (born 1957), American football coach
 John Thorne (colonial administrator) (1888–1964), civil servant in the Indian Civil Service
 John Thorne (MP) in 1388, MP for Guildford
 John Thorne (writer), American culinary writer
 John Thorne (racing driver) (born 1969), British auto racing driver

See also
 Jack Thorne (disambiguation)
 Jon Thorne (born 1967), English double bassist, producer and composer
 John Thorn (disambiguation)